Maria Caterina Farnese (18 February 1615 – 25 July 1646) was a member of the Ducal House of Farnese. She was Duchess of Modena as the first wife of Francesco I d'Este, Duke of Modena. In some sources she is known simply as Maria Farnese.

Biography

Born in Parma to Ranuccio I Farnese, Duke of Parma and his wife, Donna Margherita Aldobrandini, she was the couples sixth child and second daughter.

Her older brother Odoardo Farnese was later the Duke of Parma. 
Her mother was Margherita Aldobrandini, daughter of Gianfrancesco and Olimpia Aldobrandini who in turn, was a member of the House of Aldobrandini of Rome, and the sole heiress to the family fortune.

She was engaged to Francesco I d'Este, Duke of Modena, son of the defunct Alfonso III d'Este, Duke of Modena and Princess Isabella of Savoy.

She married Francesco on 11 January 1631 in Parma; the marriage produced nine children, three of which went on to have progeny.

She died in July 1646 having give birth to a son.  She died at the Ducal Palace of Sassuolo outside Modena, the summer residence of the Dukes of Modena.

Her nephew Ranuccio II Farnese, Duke of Parma married two of Maria Caterina's daughters, Isabella in 1664 and Maria in 1668.  Isabella died in childbirth like her mother. Her husband married again twice, firstly to her sister Vittoria Farnese in 1648 and then to Lucrezia Barberini who was the mother of Rinaldo d'Este, Duke of Modena.

Issue

Alfonso d'Este, Hereditary Prince of Modena (1632) died in infancy.
Alfonso IV d'Este, Duke of Modena (2 February 1634 – 16 July 1662) married Laura Martinozzi and had issue.
Isabella d'Este (3 October 1635 – 21 August 1666) married Ranuccio II Farnese, Duke of Parma and had issue.
Eleonora d'Este (1639–1640) died in infancy.
Tedaldo d'Este (1640–1643) died in infancy.
Almerigo d'Este (8 May 1641 – 14 November 1660) died unmarried.
Eleonora d'Este (1643 – 24 February 1722) died unmarried.
Maria d'Este (8 December 1644 – 20 August 1684) married Ranuccio II Farnese, Duke of Parma and had issue.
Tedaldo d'Este (1646) died in infancy.

Ancestry

References and notes

1615 births
1646 deaths
Maria Caterina
House of Este
Nobility from Parma
Deaths in childbirth
Maria Caterina
Maria Caterina
17th-century Italian nobility
17th-century Italian women
Italian people of German descent
Italian people of Portuguese descent
Italian people of Austrian descent
Daughters of monarchs